The Raw Air 2017 was the first edition of Raw Air, a ten-day tournament for men in ski jumping and ski flying held in Norway between 10–19 March 2017. It was part of the 2016–17 FIS Ski Jumping World Cup season. Fatih Arda İpcioğlu represented his country in qualifications of Lillehammer as first Turkish ski jumper in history of the World Cup competitions. 

On 18 March 2017, the world record was improved twice at Vikersundbakken; firstly, Robert Johansson jumped 252 metres (827 ft), and about 30 minutes later Stefan Kraft landed at 253.5 metres (832 ft).

Competition

Prize money 
The competition had a record high prize money of €100,000 in total for top 3 competitors in overall standings: €60,000 for the title, €30,000 for the second place and €10,000 for the third place.

Format 
The competition was held on four different hills in Oslo, Lillehammer, Trondheim, and Vikersund. It lasted for ten consecutive days with total of 14 rounds from individual events, team events and qualifications (prologues).

Judges

Jury 
Walter Hofer is the World Cup race director, Borek Sedlák as his assistant and Arne Åbråten as main coordinator of Raw Air:

Nations

Schedule

Map of hosts

Individual

Team

Raw Air standings

Footnotes

References 

2017
2017 in ski jumping
2017 in Norwegian sport
March 2017 sports events in Europe